Ali Abu Khumra (born 15 November 1981) is an Iraqi director and executive producer. He is co-founder and owner of the Dubbai-based production company called Etana Production located in Dubai Media City.

Early life and career
Khumra was born in Babylon Province on 15 November 1981. His parents were both engineers and had three sons.
 
After Khumra moved to the UAE, he and his brother founded Etana Production for television and film.

References

External links
 Etana Production
 Official website

Iraqi television directors
1981 births
Living people
People from Babil Governorate